Maicon dos Santos (born 18 September 1981) is a Brazilian footballer who plays as a midfielder for Uberlândia Esporte Clube.

Career
He previously played for Austria Vienna, for whom he made 3 appearances in the 2006–07 UEFA Cup, one as starter.

He was released at the end of the 2006–07 season, and signed a contract on 3 September 2007 until the end of 2007 for Clube Esportivo.

In December 2007, he signed a one-year deal with Metropolitano. In May 2008, he signed a new deal which last until December 2011. In September 2008, he joined Joinville and loaned to Grêmio Esportivo Juventus.

In February 2009 he joined Lustenau.

External links
fk-austria.at 
Brazilian FA archive 
 

1981 births
Association football midfielders
Brazilian expatriate footballers
Brazilian expatriate sportspeople in Austria
Brazilian footballers
Expatriate footballers in Austria
FC Lustenau players
FK Austria Wien players
Living people
Sportspeople from Santa Catarina (state)